Renan da Silva Moura or simply Renan  (born 22 January 1984 in São Vicente), is a Brazilian goalkeeper who played in the Campeonato Brasileiro Série D for Rio de Janeiro-based teams America and Nova Iguaçu. He also played in the Campeonato Carioca for Nova Iguaçu, Madureira and Olaria.

Contract
3 January 2008 to 3 January 2011

References

External links
 CBF
 Guardian Stats Centre

1984 births
Living people
Brazilian footballers
Madureira Esporte Clube players
CR Vasco da Gama players
Duque de Caxias Futebol Clube players
America Football Club (RJ) players
Nova Iguaçu Futebol Clube players
Association football goalkeepers
People from São Vicente, São Paulo
Footballers from São Paulo (state)